Talcott is both a surname and a given name. Notable people with the name include:

Surname:
Allen Butler Talcott (1867–1908), American landscape painter
Andrew Talcott (1797–1883), American civil engineer
Burt Talcott (1920-2016), American politician and lawyer
Enoch B. Talcott (1811–1868), New York politician
George Talcott (1786–1862), American soldier
James Talcott (1835–1916), American factor
Joseph Talcott, Governor of Connecticut (1724–41)
Lucy Talcott (1899–1970), American archaeologist
Samuel A. Talcott (1789–1836), Attorney General of New York
Thad M. Talcott (1875–1957), American politician and lawyer

Given name:
Talcott Parsons, American sociologist
Talcott Williams Seelye (1922–2006), American diplomat and writer

Place name:
Talcott, West Virginia